Sergio Rouco is an assistant coach for the Samford University men's basketball team. He is also the former head men's basketball coach at Florida International University in Miami, Florida.

Rouco is in his first season as an assistant coach for APSU’s men’s basketball team.

A former Division I head coach and 25-year veteran in the coaching ranks at many levels, Rouco came to USF after spending the previous three seasons as an assistant coach at Ole Miss. In 2012-13, Rouco helped lead a Rebel revival as Ole Miss claimed its second SEC Tournament title, won a school record-tying 27 games and earned its first NCAA Tournament appearance since 2002. He also helped coach a Rebel offense that led the league in scoring for the first time in school history. Rouco helped mentor Marshall Henderson to SEC Player of the Year honors, Murphy Holloway to the All-SEC first team and Reginald Buckner to the SEC All-Defensive Team.

In his first season with Ole Miss, Rouco helped the Rebels win 20 games and earn an NIT bid. Long known for his ability to coach defense, Ole Miss became one of the SEC's stingiest squads in 2011-12, ranking third in the league in field-goal percentage defense (.405), while Buckner was named to the SEC All-Defensive Team.

Prior to Ole Miss, Rouco was the head coach at FIU in his hometown of Miami, Fla. and led the Panthers to a 55-94 overall record. In his first season at the helm, Rouco guided FIU to the semifinal game of the Sun Belt Conference Championships, the longest postseason run for the program since 1998. He mentored four players to All-Sun Belt Conference status, including two-time honorees Ivan Almonte and Alex Galindo. Freddy Asprilla was the 2009 SBC Freshman of the Year.

Rouco began his college coaching career as an assistant at FIU from 1987-91, including one season under former Ole Miss head coach Bob Weltlich. Rouco returned to FIU as an assistant from 2000-03 before being hired by Billy Gillispie as an assistant at UTEP for the 2003-04 season.

Rouco was credited for much of the team's success in his one season at UTEP, which saw the Miners win 24 games and advance to the NCAA Tournament.

Born in Cuba and raised in Miami, Fla., Rouco found much success as a high school coach in his hometown, with head coaching stops at Loyola (1986-87) and Miami Norland (1991-95). He directed Loyola to a school-record 22 wins in 1986, while he led Miami Norland to 29 wins and a No. 1 state ranking for a portion of the 1994-95 season.

He boasts head coaching experience at the professional level for Club Mauricio Baez (1995) and Los Minas (1996) in the Dominican Republic, helping both squads reach the semifinals of the playoffs. In 1996-97, he was the head coach of the Trotamundos de Carabobo in Venezuela, and he returned to that country in 2010 to coach the Marinos de Anzoategui.

He also spent three years as an associate director at the Boys & Girls Club of Miami, where his duties included supervising athletic programs, 30 employees and 8,000 youth, as well as spearheading fund-raising efforts and payroll budgeting.

A 1987 graduate of Nova Southeastern with an education degree, Rouco and his wife, Kelly, have two sons - Sergio Alessandro and Fabian.

References

1960 births
Living people
Austin Peay Governors men's basketball coaches
Basketball coaches from Florida
Basketball players from Miami
Cuban men's basketball players
FIU Panthers men's basketball coaches
High school basketball coaches in the United States
Ole Miss Rebels men's basketball coaches
South Florida Bulls men's basketball coaches
Sports coaches from Miami
UTEP Miners men's basketball coaches